Lewisburg is an unincorporated community and census-designated place in St. Tammany Parish, Louisiana, United States. It was first listed as a CDP in the 2020 census with a population of 420.

Demographics

2020 census

Note: the US Census treats Hispanic/Latino as an ethnic category. This table excludes Latinos from the racial categories and assigns them to a separate category. Hispanics/Latinos can be of any race.

References

Unincorporated communities in St. Tammany Parish, Louisiana
Census-designated places in St. Tammany Parish, Louisiana
Unincorporated communities in New Orleans metropolitan area